Bajram Ajeti (born 5 May 1989) is an Kosovar footballer of Albanian ancestry who last played for Umeå FC in the Superettan.

References

1989 births
Living people
Norwegian people of Kosovan descent
Norwegian footballers
Norwegian expatriate footballers
Mjøndalen IF players
Asker Fotball players
Sandefjord Fotball players
Kongsvinger IL Toppfotball players
Hamarkameratene players
Moss FK players
Bryne FK players
Lillestrøm SK players
Gefle IF players
IF Brommapojkarna players
AFC Eskilstuna players
Norwegian First Division players
Eliteserien players
Superettan players
Allsvenskan players
TFF First League players
Association football forwards
Norwegian expatriate sportspeople in Sweden
Norwegian expatriate sportspeople in Turkey
Expatriate footballers in Sweden
Expatriate footballers in Turkey